Jerry Zaks (born September 7, 1946) is an American stage and television director, and actor. He won the Tony Award for Best Direction of a Play and Drama Desk Award for directing The House of Blue Leaves, Lend Me a Tenor, and Six Degrees of Separation and the Tony Award for Best Direction of a Musical and Drama Desk Award for Guys and Dolls.

Early life
Zaks was born in Stuttgart, Germany, the son of Holocaust survivors, Lily (Gliksman) and Sy Zaks, a butcher. His family immigrated to the United States in 1948, finally settling in Paterson, New Jersey, where he graduated from Eastside High School in 1963. He graduated from Dartmouth College and received a Master of Fine Arts from Smith College.

Career
Stage
He made his Broadway acting debut in the original production of Grease as "Kenickie" and appeared in Tintypes in 1980. He made his directing debut in 1981 with the off-Broadway production of Christopher Durang's Beyond Therapy, which co-starred Sigourney Weaver. He has directed many Broadway productions, both musicals and dramas.

He has also directed many Off-Broadway productions, several at Playwrights Horizons and the Public Theater. He directed the City Center Encores! productions of Girl Crazy (November 2009), Stairway to Paradise (May 2007), and Bye Bye Birdie (May 2004).

He was the director of the new musical 101 Dalmatians Musical, which toured the United States from October 2009 through April 2010. Zaks was named "creative consultant" for the new musical The Addams Family, which opened on Broadway in April 2010.

He directed the Broadway production of Sister Act, which opened in Spring 2011.

Lincoln Center
Zaks served as Resident Director at Lincoln Center from 1986 to 1990 and is a founding member of the Ensemble Studio Theatre.

Television and film
As an actor, Zaks' screen credits include Outrageous Fortune, Crimes and Misdemeanors, and Husbands and Wives. On television he has appeared in M*A*S*H and The Edge of Night and directed episodes of Everybody Loves Raymond, Frasier, Hope and Faith, and Two and a Half Men, among others. He also directed the feature films Marvin's Room and Who Do You Love? Marvin's Room won the Golden St. George at the 20th Moscow International Film Festival.

Honors
Zaks received the George Abbott Award for Lifetime Achievement in the Theater in 1994 and an honorary Doctorate of Fine Arts from Dartmouth College in 1999. He was inducted into the American Theater Hall of Fame in 2013.

Personal life
Zaks married Jill Rose, an actress, on January 14, 1979; they have two children, Emma and Hannah Zaks.

Broadway stage productions
The House of Blue Leaves, 1986
The Front Page, revival, 1986
Anything Goes, revival, 1987
Lend Me a Tenor, 1989
Six Degrees of Separation, 1990
Guys and Dolls, revival, 1992
Face Value, 1993
Laughter on the 23rd Floor, 1993
Smokey Joe's Cafe, 1995
A Funny Thing Happened on the Way to the Forum, revival, 1996
The Civil War, 1999
Epic Proportions, 1999
Swing!, 1999
The Man Who Came to Dinner, revival, 2000
45 Seconds from Broadway, 2001
Little Shop of Horrors, 2003
La Cage aux Folles, revival, 2004
The Caine Mutiny Court-Martial, revival, 2006
Losing Louie, 2006
A Bronx Tale, 2007
Sister Act, 2011
A Bronx Tale, 2016
Hello, Dolly!, revival, 2017
Meteor Shower, 2017
Mrs. Doubtfire, 2020
The Music Man, revival, 2021

Awards and nominations
Awards
1985 Obie - The Marriage of Bette and Boo
1985 Obie - The Foreigner
1986 Drama Desk Award for Outstanding Director of a Play - The Marriage of Bette & Boo and The House of Blue Leaves
1986 Tony Award for Best Direction of a Play - The House of Blue Leaves
1988 Outer Critics Circle Awards - Wenceslas Square
1989 Drama Desk Award for Outstanding Director of a Play - Lend Me a Tenor
1989 Tony Award for Best Direction of a Play - Lend Me a Tenor
1991 Drama Desk Award for Outstanding Director of a Play - Six Degrees of Separation
1991 Tony Award for Best Direction of a Play - Six Degrees of Separation
1992 Drama Desk Award for Outstanding Director of a Musical - Guys and Dolls
1992 Tony Award for Best Direction of a Musical - Guys and Dolls

Nominations
1980 Drama Desk Award for Outstanding Actor in a Musical - Tintypes
1988 Drama Desk Award for Outstanding Director of a Musical - Anything Goes
1988 Tony Award for Best Direction of a Musical - Anything Goes
1991 Drama Desk Award for Outstanding Director of a Musical - Assassins
1995 Tony Award for Best Direction of a Musical - Smokey Joe's Cafe
1996 Tony Award for Best Direction of a Musical - A Funny Thing Happened on the Way to the Forum
2006 Drama Desk Award for Outstanding Director of a Play - The Caine Mutiny Court-Martial
2017 Tony Award for Best Direction of a Musical - Hello, Dolly!
NAACP Image Award nomination for the national tour of The Tap Dance Kid
2022 Outer Critics Circle Award for Best Direction of a Musical - Mrs. Doubtfire
2022 Drama League Award for Best Direction of a Musical - The Music Man

References

External links

 Internet Off-Broadway Database listing

1946 births
American theatre directors
American male stage actors
American male television actors
American television directors
Dartmouth College alumni
Dartmouth College faculty
Drama Desk Award winners
German emigrants to the United States
20th-century German Jews
Tony Award winners
Living people
Film directors from New Jersey
20th-century American male actors
Male actors from Stuttgart
Jewish American male actors
Male actors from New Jersey
Smith College alumni
Actors from Paterson, New Jersey
Eastside High School (Paterson, New Jersey) alumni
21st-century American Jews